In Nigeria, a House of Assembly is the state-level legislature. All Houses of Assembly are unicameral, with elected members who are designated as members of the House of Assembly, assemblymen, or MHA, and who serve four-year terms.

In the Federal Capital Territory, which is not a state, there is no territory-wide legislature analogous to a State House of Assembly, with its second highest level of government being the federally-appointed Federal Capital Territory Administration and its second highest level of elected government being its six area councils.

State legislatures

Notes

References